is a private university in the city of Aomori, Aomori Prefecture, Japan. The predecessor of the school was founded in 1946 as a junior college, and it became a four-year college in 1998.

History 

 1964 - Aomori Tanaka Gakuen founded
 1970 - Aomori Central Women's Junior College started
 1998 - Aomori Central College starts school
 2014 - Establishment of the Faculty of Nursing
 2018 - Establishment of Midwifery specialization

Departments

Faculties 

 Department of Business Law
 Nursing discipline

College courses 

 Specialise Regional Management Research
 Midwifery specialization
 Regional Management Institute

External links
 Official website 

Educational institutions established in 1946
Private universities and colleges in Japan
Universities and colleges in Aomori Prefecture
Aomori (city)
1946 establishments in Japan